Clelia hussami is a species of snake in the family Colubridae. The species is endemic to Brazil.

References

Mussuranas
Clelia
Snakes of South America
Reptiles of Brazil
Endemic fauna of Brazil
Reptiles described in 2003